Wasson Rock is a prominent, mainly ice-free rock situated along the north wall near the head of Priestley Glacier, Victoria Land. Mapped by United States Geological Survey (USGS) from surveys and U.S. Navy air photos, 1960–64. Named by Advisory Committee on Antarctic Names (US-ACAN) for William G. Wasson, aviation electrician's mate with U.S. Navy Squadron VX-6 at McMurdo Station, 1966.

Rock formations of Victoria Land
Scott Coast